POU domain, class 1, transcription factor 1 (Pit1, growth hormone factor 1), also known as POU1F1, is a transcription factor for growth hormone.

Function 

PIT1 is a pituitary-specific transcription factor responsible for pituitary development and hormone expression in mammals and is a member of the POU family of transcription factors that regulate mammalian development. The POU family is so named because the first 3 members identified were PIT1 and OCT1 (MIM 164175) of mammals, and Unc-86 of C. elegans (Herr et al., 1988). PIT1 contains 2 protein domains, termed POU-specific and POU-homeo, which are both necessary for high affinity DNA binding on genes encoding growth hormone (GH; MIM 139250) and prolactin (PRL; MIM 176760). PIT1 is also important for regulation of the genes encoding prolactin and thyroid-stimulating hormone beta subunit (TSHB; MIM 188540) by thyrotropin-releasing hormone (TRH; MIM 257120) and cyclic AMP.[supplied by OMIM]

Interactions 

Pituitary-specific positive transcription factor 1 has been shown to interact with GATA2 and PITX1.

References

Further reading

External links 
 
 

POU-domain proteins